Warszawa Targówek railway station is a railway station in the Praga-Północ district of Warsaw, Poland. As of 2022, it is used by Koleje Mazowieckie, which runs services to Modlin and Warszawa Centralna.

The station was opened on 12 December 2021.

References

External links

Railway stations in Poland opened in 2021
Targówek
Railway stations served by Koleje Mazowieckie
Praga-Północ